A Night at the Moulin Rouge (French: Une nuit au Moulin-Rouge) is a 1957 French comedy film directed by Jean-Claude Roy and starring Tilda Thamar, Noël Roquevert and Jean Tissier. Much of the film is portrayed as taking place in the Moulin Rouge cabaret nightclub in Paris.

Cast
 Tilda Thamar as Tania Tango  
 Noël Roquevert as Gaston Guillaumet  
 Jean Tissier 
 Maurice Baquet 
 Marie Dubas 
 Amédée
 Miguel Amador 
 Michèle Bardollet 
 Armand Bernard 
 Denise Carvenne 
 Georges Galley 
 Gascard 
 Lisette Lebon 
 Doris Marnier 
 Gaston Orbal 
 Dominique Page 
 Maurice Sarfati 
 Robert Seller

References

Bibliography 
 St. Pierre, Paul Matthew. E.A. Dupont and his Contribution to British Film: Varieté, Moulin Rouge, Piccadilly, Atlantic, Two Worlds, Cape Forlorn. Fairleigh Dickinson University Press, 2010.

External links 
 

1957 comedy films
French comedy films
1957 films
1950s French-language films
Films directed by Jean-Claude Roy
Films set in Paris
Films set in the Moulin Rouge
1950s French films